is a major junction railway station in Aoba-ku, Sendai, Miyagi, Japan. It is a stop for all Akita and Tohoku Shinkansen trains, the eastern terminus for the Senzan Line, and major stop on both the Tohoku Main Line and Senseki Line. It is located on the border between Miyagino and Aoba Wards in Sendai, Miyagi Prefecture.

Lines 
Sendai Station is served by services operated by East Japan Railway Company (JR East), Sendai Airport Transit, and Sendai Subway. The station is served by the following lines.

JR East
 
 
 Tohoku Main Line
 Senzan Line
 Senseki Line
 Joban Line

Sendai Airport Transit
 Sendai Airport Line

Sendai Subway

Station layout

JR East
Although the main JR train station and the subway station are physically separate, there are underground passageways connecting the two. The main Sendai Station is above-ground, and is a hub for JR East containing both the Tohoku and Akita Shinkansen lines and several other local lines. The above-ground portion of Sendai Station lies in Aoba-ku, and is situated so that tracks run roughly north-south. In the station's easternmost section, underground and across the ward border in Miyagino-ku, is the platform for the east-west Senseki Line. Originally, this platform was also above ground; but in 2000, the line was extended to Aoba-dōri to the west, and the line was re-routed underground beneath the rest of the station.

Platforms
On the ground level, there are 4 platforms serving 8 tracks. On the 2nd basement, there is an island platform with 2 tracks for the Senseki Line. On the 3rd floor, there is 2 platforms serving 4 tracks of the Tohoku Shinkansen line.

Sendai Subway
The Sendai Subway lies to the west, and can be accessed from the main station via underground passageways at both ends of the station. The platform for the subway at Sendai Station is actually closer to Aoba-dōri Station than the other JR lines in Sendai Station. In fact, there is a transfer-only gate between the subway and Senseki Line platform at Aoba-dōri Station.

Platforms
The Namboku Line platforms are located on the third basement ("B3F") level, and the Tozai Line platforms are located on the fourth basement ("B4F") level.
B3F

B4F

History
The station first opened on 15 December 1887.

Passenger statistics
In fiscal 2018, the JR East station was used by an average of 91,278 passengers daily (boarding passengers only), making it the busiest JR East station outside of the Greater Tokyo Area. It is also the busiest JR East station in Miyagi Prefecture and the 50th-busiest on the JR East network as a whole. In fiscal 2018, the Sendai Subway portion of the station was used by an average of 55,614 passengers daily.

The JR East passenger figures (boarding passengers only) for previous years are as shown below.

Surrounding area

West (main) exit

The area outside the west exit of Sendai Station is the traditional center of activity around the station. This is because the area is closer to the central business district of Sendai, which initially developed around Sendai Castle.

The area is home to some of the largest department stores in Sendai. The S-Pal department store and the Station are directly connected to each other. A large elevated walkway outside the exit provides access to other department stores, such as the Loft Department Store, Sakurano Department Store, the Jujiya Co. Sendai Store, and EBeanS. EbeanS is home to Junkudo Sendai, the largest bookstore in the Tohoku Region. The AER Building, a large office building built through recent redevelopment, is also located in the area and is home to various offices and stores, such as Maruzen, another large bookstore.

The area around the Asaichi-dori street, next to EBeanS, is known as the Sendai Asaichi (Sendai morning Market), although stores are open all day long. The Asaichi is home to a wide variety of small stores that mainly sell Japanese foods.

The Sendai Metropolitan Hotel can be directly accessed via the elevated walkway and is extremely convenient for visitors unfamiliar with the area. The entrance to Sendai's largest shopping malls, such as the Clis Road Shopping District and the Ichibancho Shopping District, are located close to the exit of the elevated walkway, and a bus exchange area and taxi pool can be found under the walkway.

East exit
The area outside the east exit of Sendai Station is the "new" side of the station. It traditionally had a smaller concentration of businesses compared to the west side. That the area was not damaged by World War II bombing also delayed development in the area.

The municipal government decided to conduct redevelopment in the area in 1960. The redevelopment project is still in progress, but the area has already been largely renovated with a new bus exchange area and taxi pool. The Yodobashi Camera Sendai Store, one of the largest electronics retailers in Sendai, is located right outside of the east exit and BiVi Sendai, a department store, is located close by. The east side of the station is close to many entertainment venues, such as Beeb Sendai and Sendai Sunplaza. Miyagi Baseball Stadium is within walking distance.

References

External links

 Sendai Station map 
 
 (Sendai Subway) 

Stations of East Japan Railway Company
Railway stations in Japan opened in 1887
Jōban Line
Railway stations in Sendai
Sendai Subway Namboku Line
Senseki Line
Senzan Line
Tōhoku Main Line
Tōhoku Shinkansen